Little shag may refer to:

Little pied cormorant, or little [pied] shag (Phalacrocorax melanoleucos)
Little black cormorant, or little black shag (Phalacrocorax sulcirostris)
Little cormorant (Phalacrocorax niger)